The 2018 WCT Arctic Cup, a mixed doubles curling event on the World Curling Tour, was held May 24 to 27 at the Taimyr Ice Arena in Dudinka, Russia. It was the final event of the 2017–18 curling season. The total purse for the event was $US 20,000.

In the final, the duo of Rachel Homan from Canada and Niklas Edin from Sweden defeated the Scottish pair of Gina Aitken and Duncan Menzies 7–6 to claim the championship title. Maria Komarova and Daniil Goriachev from Russia secured third place in the tournament with an 8–3 victory over Zuzana Hájková and Tomáš Paul from Czech Republic.

Teams
The teams are listed as follows:

Round robin standings 
Final round robin standings

Round robin results
All draw times are listed in Krasnoyarsk Standard Time (UTC+07:00).

Draw 1
Thursday, May 24, 15:00

Draw 2
Thursday, May 24, 17:30

Draw 3
Friday, May 25, 09:00

Draw 4
Friday, May 25, 12:00

Draw 5
Friday, May 25, 16:30

Draw 6
Friday, May 25, 19:30

Draw 7
Saturday, May 26, 09:00

Draw 8
Saturday, May 26, 12:00

Draw 9
Saturday, May 26, 16:00

Draw 10
Saturday, May 26, 19:00

Playoffs
Source:

Semifinals
Sunday, May 27, 09:00

Third place game
Sunday, May 27, 14:00

Final
Sunday, May 27, 14:00

References

External links
CurlingZone
Official Site

2018 in Russian sport
2018 in curling
May 2018 sports events in Russia
International curling competitions hosted by Russia
Sport in Krasnoyarsk Krai